The Aurora Awards are granted annually by the Canadian SF and Fantasy Association and SFSF Boreal Inc.

The Award for Best Novella/Novelette was first awarded in 2021. It became a dedicated category, distinct from the Award for Best Novel and Award for Best Short Fiction, providing additional exposure for medium length sci-fi and fantasy literature, and represents writing with scope and word count between the two.

Derek Künsken won the first award for his 2020 novella/novelette "Tool Use by the Humans of Danzhai County".

English-language Award

Winners and nominees 
  *   Winners and joint winners

See also 

 Aurora Award for Best Novel
 Aurora Award for Best Short Fiction
 Nebula Award–Novella
 Nebula Award–Novelette
 Hugo Award–Novella
 Hugo Award–Novelette
 WFA–Novella
 Locus Award–Novella
 Locus Award–Novelette

References 

Aurora Awards